Straja resort is an Eastern European ski and snowboarding resort, situated at an elevation of 1,440 m in the Vâlcan Mountains Carpathian Mountains, in the Jiu Valley region of Hunedoara County, Romania.

Access to the resort can be made from Lupeni (a small mining town), on a 8 km long paved mountain road or by a gondola. The resort is a relatively new one, being declared a resort in 2002.

The Straja resort has about 26 km of ski area. 20 km are equipped with artificial snow. The 11 cable cars provide you with easy access to all the slopes of the resort.

There are 12 slopes, each equipped with a cable car. Five of them also benefit from a nocturnal facility, making it possible to use the slopes until late at night. They are maintained with snow-blowing machines to keep them in the best possible conditions for skiing. The snow season here usually starts in the first week of December and ends in the last week of March.

Due to the construction of the gondola and the chairlift on the Straja Peak (1868m) there are new slopes, the longest being the Straja Strand, with a length of 3.8 km. In season 2016-2017 the chairlift on the Constantinescu Piste had been open, and in the 2017–2018 season, another chair lift had replaced the ski lift number 2.

See also
Jiu Valley
Carpathian Mountains

External links
Jiu Valley Portal - the regional web portal of the Jiu Valley region and host of the official Jiu Valley websites
Enjoy Hunedoara - regional tourism portal

Jiu Valley
Ski areas and resorts in Romania